The RRS John Biscoe was a supply and research vessel used by the British Antarctic Survey between 1956 and 1991.

History
An earlier vessel,  operated from 1947-56. Both were named after the English explorer John Biscoe, who discovered parts of Antarctica in the early 1830s.

After decommissioning, she was sold and eventually scrapped in 2004 under the name Fayza Express.

Command
Biscoe'''s first visit to Halley Research Station, in 1959/60 was under the veteran captain, Bill Johnston.

From 1975, joint Masters of John Biscoe were Malcolm Phelps and Chris Elliott. Chris Elliott had joined BAS as Third Officer on John Biscoe'' in 1967, becoming Second Officer in 1970. He established the successful Offshore Biological Programme cruises and helped superintend the building of replacement . Elliott was awarded the Polar Medal in 2004 and an MBE in 2005. The sea passage between Adelaide Island and Jenny Island is named after Chris Elliott.

Footnotes

External links
Newsreel footage of a resupply voyage by the John Biscoe, 1964

History of Antarctica
Hydrography
Oceanographic instrumentation
Research vessels of the United Kingdom
1956 ships
British Antarctic Survey